Discovery High School is part of Newton-Conover City Schools and is one of the two high schools in the district, alongside Newton-Conover High School. Founded in 2005, it was created through a partnership grant with the North Carolina New Schools Project and the Bill and Melinda Gates Foundation. As of 2021, The school has 211 students on roll in grades 9–12.

References

External links
Official Site

Public high schools in North Carolina
Schools in Catawba County, North Carolina